Sorber Run is a tributary of Bowman Creek in Luzerne County and Wyoming County, in Pennsylvania, in the United States. The surficial geology in the stream's vicinity consists of alluvium and Wisconsinan Till. The watershed is designated as Exceptional Value waters and a Migratory Fishery. The stream is one of two Wilderness Trout Streams in Wyoming County.

Course

Sorber Run begins in a valley on a mountain in Lake Township, Luzerne County. It flows east-northeast for a few tenths of a mile before turning northeast for a short distance. The stream then turns north for several tenths of a mile, flowing through a valley to the west of Sorber Mountain. It then exits Lake Township, Luzerne County and enters Noxen Township, Wyoming County. In this reach, the stream turns north-northwest for some distance before turning north. After a while, it turns north-northwest, leaves its valley, and turns north, reaching its confluence with Bowman Creek.

Geography and geology

For most of the length of Sorber Run, the surficial geology immediately next to it consists of alluvium. However, the surficial geology of alluvium does not extend very far from the stream before being replaced by a till known as Wisconsinan Till. In the stream's upper reaches, the surficial geology consists of Wisconsinan Till.

During the Ice Age, when the receding glacier in the valley of Bowman Creek reached the mouth of Sorber Run, the lower outlets of Glacial Lake Bowman opened. Sorber Run is classified as a High-gradient Clearwater Creek.

Watershed

The stream is entirely within the United States Geological Survey quadrangle of Noxen.

Most of the length of Sorber Run is located within Pennsylvania State Game Lands Number 57.

History
Sorber Run was entered into the Geographic Names Information System on August 2, 1979. Its identifier in the Geographic Names Information System is 1199562.

In 2005, the Pennsylvania Fish and Boat Commission considered adding Sorber Run to its list of Class A Wild Trout Waters.

Biology
The drainage basin of Sorber Run is designated as Exceptional Value waters and a Migratory Fishery. Wild trout naturally reproduce in the stream from its headwaters downstream to its mouth. It is classified by the Pennsylvania Fish and Boat Commission as a Wilderness Trout Stream for wild brook trout from its headwaters downstream to its mouth. This makes it one of two Wilderness Trout Streams in Wyoming County, the other being Cider Run.

Sorber Run is listed on the Wyoming County Natural Areas Inventory. It was once designated as Class A Wild Trout Waters` for brook trout.

See also
Stone Run (Bowman Creek), next tributary of Bowman Creek going downstream
Baker Run, next tributary of Bowman Creek going upstream
List of rivers of Pennsylvania
List of tributaries of Bowman Creek

References

Rivers of Wyoming County, Pennsylvania
Tributaries of Bowman Creek
Rivers of Pennsylvania